The Chopard Diamond award, or simply the Diamond award, is a special award of merit given by the World Music Awards to recording artists who have sold over 100 million albums throughout their career.

Origins
The World Music Awards were established in 1989. Honors are based entirely on worldwide sales figures in the music industry based on the International Federation of the Phonographic Industry (IFPI).

The Diamond World Music Award is an award created in 2001. It is given to artists who have sold over 100 million albums over the course of their careers. It is not presented every year. To date only 6 artists have won this award.

Ceremony
The first Diamond award was issued in 2001 to British singer-songwriter Rod Stewart. He is known to have sold over 100 million records throughout his career. American entertainer Mariah Carey was honored in 2003. Carey was the first female artist to receive the award which was sponsored by Chopard in 2003 and had been previously recognized at the World Music Awards as the best selling female artist of the Millennium. Mariah Carey sold more than 150 million records worldwide, which made her the highest selling female recording artist in recorded music history.

Canadian songstress Celine Dion became the third overall and second female recipient of the Diamond award. She was honored in 2004 receiving the diamond award, recognizing her status as the World's Best Selling Female Artist of all time. According to her record label, Sony Music Entertainment, Dion has sold over 175 million albums worldwide. The American rock band Bon Jovi became the successors to Dion and the first group to be acknowledged with the Diamond award, after being honored in 2005. The band are believed to have sold over 120 million albums worldwide.

Michael Jackson, recognized by Guinness World Records as the most commercially successful entertainer of all time, became the fifth recipient of the award With estimated sales as high as 65 million copies worldwide, his 1982 album Thriller remains the best-selling album of all time. Jackson is reported by his estate to have sold as much as 350 million units throughout the world. Following Jackson's acknowledgement in 2006, The Beatles became the sixth act and second band to be honored with the Diamond award, after receiving it in 2008. The English group are the biggest-selling band in musical history, with alleged sales of 1 billion units worldwide.

Overall, four solo musicians and two bands have received the Chopard Diamond award.

The Diamond World Music Award is an award created in 2001, given to artists who have sold over 100 million albums over the course of their careers. It is not presented every year. To date only 6 artists have won this award: 
 
2001: Rod Stewart 
2003: Mariah Carey
2004: Celine Dion 
2005: Bon Jovi 
2006: Michael Jackson
2008: The Beatles

Millennium Awards 

Apart from the world's best-selling artists in the various categories and the national best-selling artists, special millennium awards were presented in 2000, for the very first time to the world's best-selling recording-artist of all time. The awards were presented to Michael Jackson and Mariah Carey in the male and female artist award categories.

See also
List of best-selling music artists

References

External links
 World Music Awards official website

European music awards
2001 establishments in Monaco
Awards established in 2001